The 1991–92 2. Bundesliga season was the eighteenth season of the 2. Bundesliga, the second tier of the German football league system. It was the first season in which the league contained clubs from former East Germany.

Bayer 05 Uerdingen and 1. FC Saarbrücken were promoted to the Bundesliga while Blau-Weiß 90 Berlin, BSV Stahl Brandenburg, TSV 1860 Munich, Hallescher FC and FC Rot-Weiß Erfurt were relegated to the Oberliga.

Format

As a result of the assimilation of six teams from the former East German Oberliga, the league was split into two groups - Nord and Süd.

In each area, a normal round robin league (22 games) was firstly completed. After this the leagues were divided in half, forming a championship division and a relegation division which saw a final round of games between the teams (10 games).
The two winners of the championship divisions were promoted to the Bundesliga while the two last placed teams in each of the relegation division were relegated. The two third-last teams in each relegation division entered a further round with the runners-up of the Oberliga Nord.

Nord
For the 1991–92 season FC Remscheid was newly promoted to the 2. Bundesliga Nord from the Oberliga while Bayer 05 Uerdingen, Hertha BSC and FC St. Pauli had been relegated to the league from the Bundesliga. BSV Stahl Brandenburg entered the league from the NOFV-Oberliga.

League table

Results

Matches 1–22

Matches 23–32

Championship group

Relegation group

Top scorers
The league's top scorers:

Süd
For the 1991–92 season TSV 1860 Munich was newly promoted to the 2. Bundesliga Süd from the Oberliga while no club had been relegated to the league from the Bundesliga. Chemnitzer FC, FC Carl Zeiss Jena, VfB Leipzig, Hallescher FC and FC Rot-Weiß Erfurt entered the league from the NOFV-Oberliga.

League table

Results

Matches 1–22

Matches 23–32

Championship group

Relegation group

Top scorers
The league's top scorers:

Relegation play-offs
Contested between the two third bottom teams from each region and the second place team in the Oberliga Nord - TSV Havelse - for the final place in 2. Bundesliga in the next season. After SpVgg Blau-Weiß 1890 Berlin's license revoking and automatic relegation, Fortuna Köln were the Nord entrant. TSV 1860 Munich were the Süd entrant.

Fortuna Köln won the playoffs and so remained in the 2. Bundesliga. TSV 1860 Munich were relegated to the Oberliga, where TSV Havelse remained.

References

External links
 2. Bundesliga 1991/1992 Süd at Weltfussball.de 
 2. Bundesliga 1991/1992 Nord at Weltfussball.de 
 1991–92 2. Bundesliga at kicker.de 

1991-92
2
Germany